Ajit, Ajith  or Ajeet may refer to:
 Ajit (given name), an Indian masculine given name (including a list of persons with the name)
 Ajit (newspaper), an Indian Punjabi daily newspaper
 Ajit Khan (born 1922), an Indian Hindi film actor
 Ajith Kumar (born 1971), an Indian Tamil film actor 
 Ajith Rajapakse (born 1974), a Sri Lankan politician
 Ajith (film), a 2014 Indian Kannada film
 HAL Ajeet, an Indian jet fighter plane
 Ajit, an alternative name of the future Buddha Maitreya

See also 
 Ajita (disambiguation)